Denis Viktorovich Koretskiy (born 19 June 1976) is a former Russian football player.

External links
 

1976 births
Living people
Russian footballers
FC Rostov players
Russian Premier League players
Place of birth missing (living people)
Association football midfielders
FC Kuban Krasnodar players